In 2014, several Pakistani television programmes made their debut. For example Bunty I Love You debuted on Hum TV on 5 January and Bashar Momin debuted on Geo TV on 14 March.

Television programmes debuting in 2014

Hum TV
 Bunty I Love You (5 January 2014)
 Joru-Ka-Ghulam (17 October 2014)
 Mr. Shamim (28 December 2014)

ARY Digital
 Kuch Kar Dikha (28 February 2014)
 Good Morning Pakistan (25 March 2014)
 Jeeto Pakistan (18 May 2014)
 Khuda Na Karay (13 October 2014)

Geo Entertainment
 Bashar Momin (14 March 2014)

Television programmes ending in 2014

Hum TV
 Bunty I Love You (18 May 2014)

ARY Digital
 Kuch Kar Dikha (16 May 2014)

Geo Entertainment
 Bashar Momin (8 November 2014)

References